Mlake is a small dispersed settlement in the hills northwest of Muta in the historical Styria region in northern Slovenia, right on the border with Austria.

References

External links
Mlake on Geopedia

Populated places in the Municipality of Muta